Game Change is a 2012 American political drama television film based on events of the 2008 United States presidential election campaign of John McCain, directed by Jay Roach and written by Danny Strong, based on the 2010 book of the same name documenting the campaign by political journalists Mark Halperin and John Heilemann. The film stars Julianne Moore, Woody Harrelson, and Ed Harris, and focuses on the chapters about the selection and performance of Governor of Alaska Sarah Palin (Moore) as running mate to Senator John McCain (Harris) in the presidential campaign.

The plot features a 2010 interview of the campaign's senior strategist Steve Schmidt (Harrelson), using flashbacks to portray McCain and Palin during their ultimately unsuccessful campaign. The film aired on HBO on March 10, 2012. It was well received by critics, with Moore's portrayal of Palin garnering praise. Schmidt praised the film, while Palin and McCain both stated they had no intention of seeing it. Alessandra Stanley of The New York Times described Moore's depiction of Palin as "a sharp-edged but not unsympathetic portrait of a flawed heroine, colored more in pity than in admiration."
Game Change has earned many awards, including a Critics' Choice Television Award, a Directors Guild of America Award, a Golden Nymph Award, three Golden Globe Awards, a Producers Guild of America Award, five Primetime Emmy Awards, and a Writers Guild of America Award.

Synopsis

The film opens in 2010 with a frame story: Republican strategist Steve Schmidt is being interviewed by Anderson Cooper for 60 Minutes. Cooper poses a difficult question regarding former vice presidential nominee Sarah Palin: was she selected because she would make the best vice president or because she would win the election?

The story flashes back to Senator John McCain's 2008 presidential campaign, which is struggling to compete with other Republican candidates during the primary season. In a desperate phone call McCain places to Schmidt, he learns about the decision to sit out the 2008 race, but McCain convinces Schmidt to reconsider.

Months later, Schmidt is serving as McCain's Senior Campaign Strategist, and with his help, McCain has clinched the Republican nomination. McCain's preferred running mate, Senator Joe Lieberman, is rejected by the majority of his senior advisers – including Schmidt – because he will not help compete with the celebrity of their opponent, Democratic Senator Barack Obama. The strategists quickly look for a "game change" candidate. The replacement must do four things: excite the conservative base, win the vote of independents, distance the campaign from the Bush administration, and close the "gender gap" – the GOP's 20-point deficit with women. Investigating prominent female Republican politicians, the campaign finds Palin, the governor of Alaska, to have the charismatic qualities they want. After an exceptionally brief vetting process, she is selected. Palin's eventual public reveal creates the buzz that Schmidt and McCain were looking for, bringing them to even or better with Obama in the polls.

While Palin's acceptance speech at the Republican National Convention is well received, the campaign becomes concerned that she is ignorant about many political issues and grossly unprepared. Schmidt handles controversies from her past, such as Troopergate and "Bridge to Nowhere", while other staff attempt to fill broad gaps in her understanding of domestic and foreign politics. While prepping for the interviews, she is preoccupied with her approval ratings in Alaska and the absence of her family while campaigning, eventually becoming unresponsive to advisers who begin to question her mental state. Several prominent blunders in major interviews, such as those with Katie Couric, are a source of mockery in the media and frustration in the campaign. Overwhelmed and poorly prepared, Palin lashes back at attempts by Schmidt and Nicolle Wallace to give her a crash course on the major issues, then blames them for setting up public interviews that ultimately reveal her lack of knowledge.

The staff also comes to accept that Palin is better at memorizing and delivering lines than she is at actually understanding issues. Thus, they grudgingly prepare her for the Vice-Presidential debate by simply having Palin memorize about forty minutes' worth of talking points, which manages to get her through the debate without major incident. However, Palin's growing popularity with the Republican base, even as she alienates mainstream voters, soon overshadows the campaign; Palin becomes uncooperative, rejecting – and conflicting with – Schmidt and the rest of the campaign staff as she gains her own following. Palin, in fact, rebuffs McCain by publicly disagreeing with his decision to end campaigning in Michigan. By late 2008, with prospects appearing poor, the campaign staff boosts a negative campaign against Obama's past associations with the liberal elite, which Palin supports but McCain resists. McCain, meanwhile, becomes discouraged by the negative campaigning, watching growing hostility and vitriol emerge toward Obama among McCain's supporters. With Election Day approaching, senior campaigners express regret that Palin turned out to be style without substance, with Schmidt lamenting that they neglected to vet her competency. McCain consoles Schmidt by reaffirming that taking a risk with Palin was better than fading away.

When Obama wins on Election Night, Schmidt tries to stop a rebellious Palin from giving a concession speech along with McCain's. She appeals to McCain, who agrees with Schmidt. He tells Palin that she is now one of the party leaders and warns her not to let herself be hijacked by extremism. Rick Davis (McCain's campaign manager) comments that Palin will soon be forgotten. During McCain's concession speech, he thanks Palin, who receives enormous and sustained applause, chants, and enthusiasm from the crowd, which is noted in the faces of McCain's advisors. The film returns to the 2010 interview; regarding Cooper's question about whether he would pick Palin again if he had the chance to go back, Schmidt replies that life does not give do-overs.

Cast

 Julianne Moore as Sarah Palin, Governor of Alaska
 Woody Harrelson as Steve Schmidt, Senior Campaign Strategist
 Ed Harris as John McCain, U.S. Senator from Arizona
 Peter MacNicol as Rick Davis, Campaign Manager
 Jamey Sheridan as Mark Salter, Senior Adviser and Speechwriter
 Sarah Paulson as Nicolle Wallace, Director of Communications
 Ron Livingston as Mark Wallace, Senior Adviser
 David Barry Gray as Todd Palin
 Larry Sullivan as Chris Edwards, Deputy Chief of Staff
 Melissa Farman as Bristol Palin
 Kevin Bigley as Track Palin
 Brian d'Arcy James as Ted Frank
 Bruce Altman as Fred Davis, Chief Media Strategist
 Colby French as Tucker Eskew, Senior Media Adviser
 John Rothman as Arthur B. Culvahouse, Jr., Vetting Attorney
 Sandy Bainum as Cindy McCain
 Tiffany Thornton as Meghan McCain
 Alex Hyde-White as Lindsey Graham, U.S. Senator from South Carolina
 Justin Gaston as Levi Johnston
 Austin Pendleton as Joe Lieberman, U.S. Senator from Connecticut

The authors of the book Game Change, Mark Halperin and John Heilemann, appear in a cameo as two reporters questioning Schmidt. Actual footage from the 2008 campaign portrayed the Democratic candidates Barack Obama and Joe Biden as well as numerous reporters, including Anderson Cooper, Katie Couric, Wolf Blitzer, Candy Crowley, Charles Gibson, and John King. At times, the film employed doubles and editing to make it appear that the actors are interacting with historical footage, such as in the presidential debate scenes featuring the real Obama, the real Wolf Blitzer, and Harris as McCain.

Production
HBO optioned the book Game Change, by John Heilemann and Mark Halperin, in January 2010. In February 2011, development began with Danny Strong writing and Jay Roach directing. The two had collaborated as writer and director on the 2008 HBO film Recount, about the controversial result of the 2000 U.S. presidential election. Although Strong and Roach based the film on the part of the book dealing with the McCain–Palin campaign, they had also considered a film dealing with Obama's primary battle against Hillary Clinton – an idea ultimately dropped due to the length and complexity of that story, among other reasons. Strong said he interviewed 25 people from the McCain–Palin campaign and referenced other books and articles, including Palin's memoir Going Rogue, in addition to the book on which the film was based.

The main cast was announced in March 2011, starting with Julianne Moore as Palin, Ed Harris as John McCain, with Woody Harrelson, who plays McCain campaign chair Steve Schmidt, coming aboard soon thereafter. The film was primarily shot in Maryland, along with a hotel scene shot in Wilmington, Delaware. The film was also shot and produced in Albuquerque and Santa Fe, New Mexico. The film premiered at the Newseum in Washington, D.C. on March 8 prior to its public debut on HBO on March 10, 2012.

Reception

Ratings

Game Change was watched by 2.1 million people on its debut night, which marked the highest ratings for an HBO original film since their 2004 film Something the Lord Made.

Reviews
Game Change received generally positive reviews, with 65% of the critics polled by Rotten Tomatoes giving it favorable reviews (based on 37 reviews), with an averaged score of 6.9 out of 10. Metacritic lists the film as scoring 74 out of 100, based on 25 reviews by critics, signifying a "generally favorable" critical response.

David Hinckley of The New York Daily News wrote, "Julianne Moore’s physical Palin in Game Change, which debuts March 10, is even more dead-on than Tina Fey's." Fey, who was noted for her physical resemblance to Palin, won an Primetime Emmy Award for Outstanding Guest Actress in a Comedy Series in 2009 for her satirical impersonation of Palin on the sketch comedy TV show Saturday Night Live. Several excerpts from these impersonations were used in the film.

The Hollywood Reporters Tim Goodman wrote that the movie "boldly raises the question about whether Palin is mentally unbalanced." He called Moore's performance "virtuoso (and likely Emmy-winning)." Roger Ebert gave the movie three and a half stars. Entertainment Weeklys Ken Tucker gave it an A−.

The Los Angeles Times wrote: "The overall atmosphere of the film is surprisingly kind to all, much more fatalistic than hypercritical and certainly not derisive. Palin's rise and fall is depicted as series of bad decisions made in relatively good faith that lead up to a hideous car crash." Newsday commented: "Moore's performance ... is superb. ... A luminous and fully alive portrait by a first-rate actress." The San Francisco Chronicle also praised the acting: "Game Change is graced by three extraordinary performances in the leading roles, beginning with Moore's portrayal of Palin, which is both complex and entirely credible." The Boston Globe wrote: "Whether “Game Change’’ is a definitive accounting of what happened, and whether some viewers will accept it as such is unknowable. But from a dramatic standpoint is the film entertaining? You betcha."

Response from the McCain campaign
Palin herself said Game Change was based on a "false narrative" and that she did not intend to see it. The film, and the book it is based upon, have been described by John and Cindy McCain as inaccurate. Like Palin, McCain said he did not intend to see it, and took issue with the "exceeding amount of coarse language" that was attributed to him in the film. Many of Sarah Palin's campaign aides have criticized the accuracy of the film. Randy Scheunemann, who tutored Palin on foreign policy matters during the campaign, said: "To call this movie fiction gives fiction a bad name." According to her campaign staff, many had not been contacted by the filmmakers or the authors of the book on which it is based.

However, Steve Schmidt, the campaign's chief strategist, stated: "Ten weeks of the campaign are condensed into a two-hour movie. But it tells the truth of the campaign. That is the story of what happened." He later said that watching the film was tantamount to "an out-of-body experience."

Nicolle Wallace, a chief Palin 2008 aide, said she found Game Change highly credible, saying the film "captured the spirit and emotion of the campaign." Wallace also told ABC News Chief Political Correspondent George Stephanopoulos that the film was "true enough to make me squirm." Both Wallace and Schmidt have had public feuds with Sarah Palin since the 2008 campaign ended.

Melissa Farman, who played Bristol Palin, said it was never the film's intention to portray Sarah Palin in a negative light because the film was not meant to be about Palin, but about "politics at large" and what it means to be a politician in this era.

Accolades

References

External links

 
 archive at The Baltimore Sun
 Interview with Halperin and Heilemann on the film adaptation of Game Change, February 29, 2012, C-SPAN
 Panel discussion on the film adaptation of Game Change, March 9, 2012, C-SPAN

2012 films
2012 drama films
2010s political drama films
2008 United States presidential election in popular culture
American films based on actual events
American political drama films
Best Miniseries or Television Movie Golden Globe winners
Cultural depictions of Sarah Palin
Drama films based on actual events
American drama television films
Films about elections
Films based on non-fiction books
Films directed by Jay Roach
Films scored by Theodore Shapiro
Films set in 2007
Films set in 2008
Films shot in Delaware
Films shot in Maryland
Films with screenplays by Danny Strong
HBO Films films
Peabody Award-winning broadcasts
Playtone films
Political films based on actual events
Primetime Emmy Award for Outstanding Made for Television Movie winners
Television films based on actual events
Television films based on books
Works about John McCain
2010s American films